Probable lysosomal cobalamin transporter is a protein that in humans is encoded by the LMBRD1 gene.

References

Further reading

External links
  GeneReviews/NCBI/NIH/UW entry on Disorders of Intracellular Cobalamin Metabolism